This is a list of schools in the Metropolitan Borough of Gateshead in Tyne and Wear, England.

State-funded schools

Primary schools

Barley Mow Primary School, Birtley
Bede Community Primary School, Gateshead
Bill Quay Primary School, Bill Quay
Birtley East Community Primary School, Birtley
Blaydon West Primary School, Blaydon
Brandling Primary School, Felling
Brighton Avenue Primary School, Gateshead
Caedmon Community Primary School, Gateshead
Carr Hill Community Primary School, Gateshead
Chopwell Primary School, Chopwell
Clover Hill Community Primary School, Whickham
Colegate Community Primary School, Gateshead
Corpus Christi RC Primary School, Gateshead
Crookhill Community Primary School, Ryton
The Drive Community Primary School, Felling
Dunston Hill Community Primary School, Dunston
Emmaville Primary School, Crawcrook
Eslington Primary School, Gateshead
Falla Park Community Primary School, Gateshead
Fell Dyke Community Primary School, Gateshead
Fellside Community Primary School, Whickham
Front Street Primary School, Whickham
Glynwood Community Primary School, Gateshead
Greenside Primary School, Greenside
Harlow Green Community Primary School, Gateshead
High Spen Primary School, High Spen
Highfield Community Primary School, Rowlands Gill
Kells Lane Primary School, Low Fell
Kelvin Grove Community Primary School, Gateshead
Kibblesworth Academy, Kibblesworth
Larkspur Community Primary School, Gateshead
Lingey House Primary School, Gateshead
Lobley Hill Primary School, Lobley Hill
Oakfield Infant School, Gateshead
Oakfield Junior School, Gateshead
Parkhead Community Primary School, Winlaton
Portobello Primary School, Birtley
Ravensworth Terrace Primary School, Birtley
Riverside Primary Academy, Dunston
Roman Road Primary School, Gateshead
Rowlands Gill Junior School, Rowlands Gill
Ryton Community Infant School, Ryton
Ryton Junior School, Ryton
Sacred Heart RC Primary School, Byermoor
St Agnes RC Primary School, Crawcrook
St Aidan's CE Primary School, Gateshead
St Alban's RC Primary School, Pelaw
St Anne's RC Primary School, Gateshead
St Augustine's RC Primary School, Gateshead
St Joseph's RC Infant School, Birtley
St Joseph's RC Junior School, Birtley
St Joseph's RC Primary School, Blaydon
St Joseph's RC Primary School, Gateshead
St Joseph's RC Primary School, Rowlands Gill
St Mary's and St Thomas Aquinas RC Primary School, Blaydon
St Mary's RC Primary School,  Whickham
St Oswald's RC Primary, Wrekenton
St Peter's RC Primary School, Low Fell
St Philip Neri RC Primary School, Dunston
St Wilfrid's RC Primary School, Gateshead
South Street Community Primary School, Gateshead
Swalwell Primary School, Swalwell
Wardley Primary School, Wardley
Washingwell Community Primary School, Whickham
Whickham Parochial CE Primary School, Whickham
White Mere Community Primary School, Wardley
Windy Nook Primary School, Gateshead
Winlaton West Lane Community Primary School, Winlaton

Secondary schools

Cardinal Hume Catholic School, Gateshead
Emmanuel College, Lobley Hill
Grace College, Gateshead
Heworth Grange School, Felling
Kingsmeadow Community Comprehensive School, Dunston
Lord Lawson of Beamish Academy, Birtley
St Thomas More Catholic School, Blaydon
Thorp Academy, Ryton
Whickham School, Whickham
XP Gateshead, Felling

Special and alternative schools
The Cedars Academy, Low Fell
Dryden School, Low Fell
Eslington Primary School, Gateshead
Furrowfield School, Felling
Gibside School, Bensham
Hill Top School, Felling
River Tyne Academy Gateshead, Sheriff Hill

Further education
Gateshead College

Independent schools

Primary and preparatory schools
Keser Girls School, Gateshead
Keser Torah Boys' School, Gateshead

Senior and all-through schools
Ateres Girls High School, Felling
The Gateshead Cheder Primary School, Gateshead
Gateshead Jewish Boarding School, Gateshead

Special and alternative schools
Haskel School, Gateshead

Gateshead
Schools in Gateshead
Lists of buildings and structures in Tyne and Wear